Ed Zaunbrecher (born March 1, 1950) is an American football college football coach. He served as the head football coach at Northeast Louisiana University—now known as the University of Louisiana at Monroe,—from 1994 to 1998, compiling a record of 20–36. He is currently the head instructor for the Ed Zaunbrecher Coaching School.

Coaching career
During his tenure as head coach at the Northeast Louisiana, Zaunbrecher transitioned the football program from NCAA Division I-AA to NCAA Division I-A. He held that position for five seasons, from 1994 until 1998. His coaching record at the Northeast Louisiana was 20–36. The highlights of his stint at Northeast Louisiana included victories over Southeastern Conference teams Mississippi State and Kentucky, and giving numerous other teams scares including a 1996 near victory over a ranked Auburn team.

Head coaching record

References

External links
 Ed Zaunbrecher Coaching School

1950 births
Living people
Arizona Wildcats football coaches
Florida Gators football coaches
Illinois Fighting Illini football coaches
Louisiana–Monroe Warhawks football coaches
LSU Tigers football coaches
Marshall Thundering Herd football coaches
Michigan State Spartans football coaches
Middle Tennessee Blue Raiders football players
Purdue Boilermakers football coaches
Rice Owls football coaches
Wake Forest Demon Deacons football coaches
University of Arizona alumni
People from Maury County, Tennessee
People from Rayne, Louisiana